HMS Culloden was a 74-gun third rate ship of the line of the Royal Navy, launched on 16 June 1783 at Rotherhithe. She took part in some of the most famous battles of the French Revolutionary Wars and the Napoleonic Wars before she was broken up in 1813.

French Revolutionary Wars

One of her first engagements was at the Glorious First of June, under Captain Isaac Schomberg. 
She was captained by Sir Thomas Troubridge in the Battle of Cape St Vincent, in which he led the line. Culloden was damaged, and had 10 men killed and 47 wounded. She later took part in the Battle of Santa Cruz de Tenerife. She participated in the Battle of the Nile, but ran aground on shoals before being able to engage the French fleet, and subsequently did not actively engage the enemy. She was assisted by HMS Mutine whilst aground.

Napoleonic Wars
Culloden, Captain Christopher Cole, captured the French privateer Émilien on 26 September 1806 after a chase that lasted two days and a night. He described her as a ship corvette of 18 guns and 150 men. When the British took possession of Emilien at 2a.m. on the 25th, close off the shoals of Point Guadaveri they found out that they had driven her ashore the night before. She had had to jettison 12 guns, her anchors, and her boats, to enable her to be refloated. Cole noted that Émilien was "formerly His Majesty's Sloop Trincomalee". He further noted that she was copper fastened, and that under the name of Gloire had "annoyed our Trade". However, on this cruise she was two months out of Île de France without having made any captures. Lloyd's List reported that Culloden had captured a large French privateer named Ameleon in the Indian Sea and taken her into Madras. The Royal Navy took Émilien into service as HMS Emilien, but sold her in 1808 and it is not clear that she ever saw active service.

On 5 July 1808 Culloden captured the French privateer Union off Ceylon. Union had been at sea for 27 days, having sailed from Mauritius, when she encountered Culloden, but had not captured anything. Union was armed with eight guns and had a crew of 60 Europeans and 20 lascars.

Fate
Culloden was finally broken up in February 1813.

Notes, citations, and references
Notes

Citations

References

 
 Lavery, Brian (2003) The Ship of the Line - Volume 1: The development of the battlefleet 1650-1850. Conway Maritime Press. .

External links

Ships of the line of the Royal Navy
Ganges-class ships of the line
1783 ships